Bewakoofiyaan is a 2014 Indian Hindi-language romantic comedy film directed by Nupur Asthana, written by Habib Faisal and produced by Aditya Chopra under the banner of Yash Raj Films. The film stars Ayushmann Khurrana, Sonam Kapoor and Rishi Kapoor. It was released on 14 March 2014 to mixed reviews, and emerged a commercial failure. The movie got many dislikes because it’s bad people say

Plot
Mohit Chadha (Ayushmann Khurrana) is promoted from Junior Executive in Marketing to Senior Executive. He goes for lunch with Girlfriend Mayera (Sonam Kapoor) after the promotion, where he proposes to her. Meanwhile, Mayera's father, V.K. Sehgal (Rishi Kapoor), a Government Officer, is nearing his retirement. V.K. Sehgal does not approve of their wedding, as he believe Mohit would not be able to provide for her and give her happiness. V.K. goes to Mohit's office and challenges him: if he passes a test, then he can marry Mayera. He calls Mohit to the club every day to play squash. V.K. soon retires from his Office.

Mohit is laid off by his company. V.K. goes to confirm if Mohit has been laid off. Both Mohit, Mayera and his friend pretend that Mohit is still holding his Job. V.K. shows Mohit his criminal inquiries and Mohit gives V.K. an idea of working after his retirement, which V.K. likes very much. Mohit goes on a spree to find a new job. V.K. tries to find new work after his retirement. Mayera is against it. V.K. compels Mohit to secretly help him get some work, going against Mayera's wish. Mohit receives calls from everywhere to return money; he calls Mayera and she gives him ₹50,000.

Next day, when Mohit asks Mayera for money for his apartment. She does not have it, and they have a fight. Mohit sells his car, and gives Mayera her money back, and they break-up. The same day, V.K. calls Mohit and Mayera, as he got an interview call and engagement rings; Mohit reveals to V.K. that he is jobless. Mohit leaves his apartment, rents a smaller place, and joins a cafe. Meanwhile, Mayera accepts a Dubai transfer. She tells her father about her plan to move to Dubai.When she returns, she shows her dad their new apartment and takes out their passports. He goes to Mohit's old office and asks Imi where he is. Imi takes him to the car garage manager, who takes them to the cafe. V.K. visits the cafe and orders food cheaply. V.K. tells Mohit that Mayera is going to Dubai. Back at home, their maid, Radha starts crying. Mohit goes to their house and screams out for Mayera; V.K. lectures him, and Mohit tells V.K. that he is being uncool.

Mayera tells her dad that it is enough, and Mohit is a National Level under 16 silver medalist in squash but still kept losing to V.K. She tells him that she does not have fun shopping without him because there is nobody to say, "Very Hot, Khaa Jau Tere Ko". V.K. prepares for the interview in a suit with four pockets, then changes clothes, and goes to Mohit's apartment to get a tie. The couple go to the coffee shop, where V.K. comes back as the CEO of the company.

Cast
 Ayushmann Khurrana as Mohit Chaddha
 Sonam Kapoor as Mayera Sehgal, Mohit's girlfriend
 Rishi Kapoor as Vinod Kumar "VK" Sehgal, Mayera's father
 Deepika Amin as Rupali Wadhwa, Mohit's boss
 Savi Sidhu as Masterji
 Sapan Saran
 Gurpal Singh as Gursharan Singh

Production

The film was announced in December 2012. Bewakoofiyaan was written by Habib Faisal (of Ishaqzaade fame) and directed by Nupur Asthana (of Mujhse Fraaandship Karoge fame).  It is a "slice of life" film, set during a recession. Ayushmann Khurrana's and Sonam Kapoor's characters are described as being "passionately in love" and believe that their love can help them survive. However, Kapoor's father strongly disagrees.

Ayushmann Khurrana, Sonam Kapoor and Rishi Kapoor were cast in December 2012. Ayushmann and Sonam are paired opposite each other for the first time, with Rishi Kapoor cast in the role of Sonam Kapoor's father.

Shooting began in February 2013 in Delhi and Gurgaon. Part of the filming took place in Dubai.

Soundtrack

The soundtrack was composed by Raghu Dixit, while the lyrics were penned by Anvita Dutt, except where noted. Dixit was the music composer for Asthana's last film, Mujhse Fraaandship Karoge. The song "O Heeriye" is a bonus track on the soundtrack.

Track listing

Critical reception
Bewakoofiyaan received mixed responses from critics.

Taran Adarsh of Bollywood Hungama praised it, saying the film was a "pleasant surprise" with "super performances of  Rishi, Ayushmann and Sonam, watertight writing, skilled direction and dollops of humor." Ultimately, he gave . Saibal Chatterjee in his review for NDTV described the film to score "with its disarming simplicity" thereby "never less than watchable". Tushar Joshi reviewing for Daily News and Analysis stated it to miss out on the "opportunity to be smarter and funnier" by playing "too safe to rise above the ordinary". Madhureeta Mukherjee in her review for The Times of India stated the film to have its share of beauty but falters with a helpless script".

According to Rajeev Masand of CNN-IBN, ″Asthana directs with an easy hand, but she's saddled with a dead duck of a script that simply can't be saved.″

In a review for Hindustan Times by Anupama Chopra stated, "This is one of those films that doesn't either offend or engage. It just goes on, in a bland, listless manner, until we hit happily ever after." She praised Khuranna's performance, saying, "The strongest performance here is Ayushmann's. His anger and frustration at losing the good life are palpable." Concerning Sonam Kapoor's performance, she said, "Sonam looks lovely. She attempts to imbue Mayera with some texture but it's an uphill climb."

Rahul Desai of the Mumbai Mirror wrote ″This is the kind of middling film that one doesn't know what to make of. It looks clean, simple and doesn't boast of any highs or lows. Everything, including the change of heart(s), is predictable. To be fair, the screenplay doesn't aspire to blow your socks off. Even director Nupur Asthana (Mujhse Fraaandship Karoge) seems to have made her peace with that.″ He ended with ″Bewakoofiyaan isn't Nupur Asthana's best effort (out of two), but I'm still going to look forward to her next. All she needs is an ambitious screenplay and a voice—perhaps her own?″

Danny Bowes from RogerEbert.com gave it , writing, ″The movie is perfectly acceptable middle-of-the-road romantic comedy material, and for fans of such things it should certainly hit the spot.″

The New York Times critic Andy Webster wrote "This tale of a yuppie couple (played by Ayushmann Khurrana and Sonam Kapoor) flirts with intriguing notions of recessionary struggle, though strained, contrived humour bogs it down... It is the question of money's influence on passion and relationships that gives Ms. Asthana's movie what dramatic traction it has."

Box office
The film made on a budget of  including promotional expense of  released on 14 March 2014.

Domestic
Bewakoofiyaan opened to poor response on the first day of its release. It went on to collect — on its first day. It managed to collect  over the first three days of its release showing very little growth on it second day, which Box Office India claimed was necessary for a multiplex-oriented film like itself.

Overseas
A report by Rentrak states the film collected in the first three days US$46,888 (INR 2864,000) releasing in 51 theatres in United States; $20,850 (INR 1274,000) releasing in 15 theatres in Canada; 33,620 pounds (INR 3412,000) in 26 theatres in United Kingdom and Ireland; 22,145 Australian dollar (INR 1228,000) in Australia with a screen count of 14; and 12,558 New Zealand dollar (INR 656,000) in New Zealand where it has released in 1 theatre.

References

External links
 
 
 
 

2014 films
Indian romantic comedy films
Films scored by Raghu Dixit
2014 romantic comedy films
2010s Hindi-language films
Films shot in Delhi
Yash Raj Films films
Films shot in Dubai